Elói André Milheiro da Silva (born 9 March 1993, in Covilhã)  is a Portuguese footballer who plays for F.C. Porto B as a goalkeeper.

Football career
On 12 May 2013, Silva made his professional debut with FC Porto B in a 2012–13 Segunda Liga match against Sporting Braga B, when he started and played the full game.

References

External links

Stats and profile at LPFP

1993 births
Living people
People from Covilhã
Portuguese footballers
Association football goalkeepers
Liga Portugal 2 players
FC Porto players
Sportspeople from Castelo Branco District